The Diocese of Kurunegala is a diocese of the Church of Ceylon (which is part of the Anglican Communion). The See was erected in 1950 from that of the Diocese of Colombo as one of two dioceses of the Church of England in Ceylon.

The diocese covers the districts of Kurunegala, Kandy, Matale, Kegalle, Anuradhapura, and Polonnaruwa.

List of bishops

See also 
 Cathedral of Christ the King, Kurunegala

References

Publications
 One hundred years in Ceylon, or, The centenary volume of the Church Missionary Society in Ceylon, 1818-1918 (1922) Author: Balding, John William Madras: Printed at the Diocesan Press.
 The Church of Ceylon - her faith and mission Published in 1945, Printed at the Daily News Press by Bernard de Silva for the Church of Ceylon.
 The Church of Ceylon: A History, 1945-1995 Editor: Medis, Frederick, Published for the Diocese of Colombo.

External links
 Official Web Site of Church of Ceylon, Diocese of Kurunegala
 The Church of Ceylon (Anglican Communion)
 Anglican Church of Ceylon News
 The Church of Ceylon - World Council of Churches website